The 1955–56 Georgetown Hoyas men's basketball team represented Georgetown University during the 1955–56 NCAA college basketball season. Harry "Buddy" Jeannette coached them in his fourth and final season as head coach. The team was an independent and played its home games at McDonough Gymnasium on the Georgetown campus in Washington, D.C. It finished with a record of 13-11 and had no post-season play.

Season recap

Forward Warren Buehler had been the team's top scorer the previous season, but took a leave of absence from the team this season to recover from an injury. With Buehler out, junior forward Joe Missett took the lead, scoring in double figures in all but one game and averaging 18.3 points and 13.5 rebounds per game. The team's top scorer for the year, he also had 325 rebounds, a total unmatched in Georgetown history except by Merlin Wilson, who played center for the Hoyas from 1972 to 1976.

Sophomore forward Ken Pichette joined the varsity after a successful season with the freshman team the previous year. Based on his freshman performance, he was expected to take the lead in scoring for the varsity team this season with Buehler out for the year, but he got off to a slow start, not scoring until his fifth game. However, he began to score steadily in January 1956, and he scored in doubled figures in 13 of the final 14 games of the year.

Junior forward Matt White competed with Pichette and senior forward Jack Walsh for a starting position, but he became a valuable scorer when he proved able to play effectively as a guard as well as a forward. His 24 points against Morehead State late in the season were his career high.

The team finished with a record of 13-11, the only winning season for Georgetown between 1952-53 and 1961-62. It had no postseason play, and was not ranked in the Top 20 in the Associated Press Poll or Coaches' Poll at any time.

In his first season, Buddy Jeannette had led Georgetown to its first-ever berth in the National Invitation Tournament; it also was only the second post-season tournament appearance in Georgetown men's basketball history and the first since the 1942-43 Hoyas played in the 1943 NCAA Tournament. A combination of injuries and academic losses led to disappointment over the next three years, and he resigned at the end of this season, departing with no other post-season tournament appearances, two winning seasons, and an overall record of 49-49 during his four-season tenure. He would later serve as head coach of the National Basketball Associations Baltimore Bullets for the 1964–65 season, as their interim head coach for part of the 1966–67 season, and as head coach of the American Basketball Association's Pittsburgh Pipers for part of the 1969–70 season.

Roster
Sources

1955–56 schedule and results

Sources

|-
!colspan=9 style="background:#002147; color:#8D817B;"| Regular Season

References

Georgetown Hoyas men's basketball seasons
Georgetown
Georgetown Hoyas men's basketball team
Georgetown Hoyas men's basketball team